Medvensky District is an administrative and municipal district (raion), one of the twenty-eight in Kursk Oblast, Russia. It is located in the southern central part of the oblast. Its administrative center is the urban locality (a work settlement) of Medvenka. Population:  19,220 (2002 Census);  The population of Medvenka accounts for 27.6% of the district's total population.

Geography
Medvensky District is located in the south central region of Kursk Oblast.  The terrain is hilly plain on the Central Russian Upland. There are no major rivers through the district.  The district is 15 km south of the city of Kursk and 480 km southwest of Moscow.  The area measures 25 km (north-south), and 50 km (west-east).  The administrative center is the town of Medvenka. The district is bordered on the north by Kursky District, on the east by Solntsevsky District, on the south by Oboyansky District, and on the west by Bolshesoldatsky District.

Administrative division of the district
The district is divided into 10 administrative units: the urban-type settlement Medvenka as a municipal urban settlement and 9 selsoviets:

There are one urban-type settlement and 146 rural localities within the district, including 19 unpopulated ones:

Economy
In the Medvensky District, the leading economic sector is agriculture. As of 2017, there are 128 peasant farms and 11 agricultural enterprises that are engaged in agricultural production. This region is a major producer and distributor of grain crops, sugar beets, milk, and meat.

References

Notes

Sources

External links
Medvensky District on Google Maps
Medvensky District on OpenStreetMap

Districts of Kursk Oblast